The Burnside Avenue station is an express station on the IRT Jerome Avenue Line of the New York City Subway. Located at the intersection of Burnside and Jerome Avenues in the Bronx, it is served by the 4 train at all times. It also serves as a rush hour short turn northern terminal for select 4 trains from Crown Heights–Utica Avenue.

This station was constructed by the Interborough Rapid Transit Company as part of the Dual Contracts and opened in 1917.

History

Construction and opening

The Dual Contracts, which were signed on March 19, 1913, were contracts for the construction and/or rehabilitation and operation of rapid transit lines in the City of New York. The contracts were "dual" in that they were signed between the City and two separate private companies (the Interborough Rapid Transit Company and the Brooklyn Rapid Transit Company), all working together to make the construction of the Dual Contracts possible. The Dual Contracts promised the construction of several lines in the Bronx. As part of Contract 3, the IRT agreed to build an elevated line along Jerome Avenue in the Bronx.

Burnside Avenue first opened as Burnside Avenue–New York University on June 2, 1917 as part of the initial section of the line to Kingsbridge Road on June 2, 1917. Service was initially operated as a shuttle between Kingsbridge Road and 149th Street. Through service to the IRT Lexington Avenue Line began on July 17, 1918. The line was completed with a final extension to Woodlawn on April 15, 1918. This section was initially served by shuttle service, with passengers transferring at 167th Street. The construction of the line encouraged development along Jerome Avenue, and led to the growth of the surrounding communities. The city government took over the IRT's operations on June 12, 1940.

Station renovations
In 1973, New York University sold its Bronx campus located northwest of the station to the City University of New York in 1973. A year after the acquisition, in 1974, the station was renamed to Burnside Avenue–180th Street because 180th Street was used as another name for Burnside Avenue at the time. It would further be renamed Burnside Avenue in 1979.

In 1981, the Metropolitan Transportation Authority (MTA) listed the station as one of 69 stations in dire need of renovation. The report prompted an early renovation that continued until 1985. Among the things that were done to the station during that time included a painted orange platform edge in addition to the yellow platform edge that was originally on each platform. New, corrugated signposts were installed and spaced evenly on the platform; these bore the station name in white lettering against a black metal sign (the font used for the signs was Akzidenz-Grotesk; it was first used as the agency's font prior to renovation).

The fencing around the entrances to the platforms from the mezzanine were painted black while the rest of the platforms, including a few mushroom shaped incandescent lampposts that were installed during the renovation and the fences around each of the four entrances, were painted red; most of the lampposts bore the 180th Street name. The original hand rails, as well as the original iron maidens were also painted yellow. Two fences that were at the south end of each platform retained their paint color; the one on the Woodlawn bound platform would later be replaced with a second Communication Room.

As early as 1996, the 180th Street name began to be retired on the uncovered parts of each platform by replacing the mushroom shaped incandescent lampposts with unpainted sodium vapor lampposts. By 1999, all of the lights in those areas were replaced with sodium vapor lampposts.

This station was renovated a second time from June 17 to October 16, 2006 as part of a $55 million project to renovate five stations (183rd Street, Kingsbridge Road, Bedford Park Boulevard and Mosholu Parkway being the other four) on the IRT Jerome Avenue Line, bringing them to a state of good repair. During this time, the mezzanine area and staircases received a facelift, while both platform canopies and the structural beams that hold each canopy were replaced and yellow tactile edge warning strips were installed. Also, the token booth in the mezzanine was reduced in size and relocated from directly facing the main turnstiles from the unpaid side of fare control to facing the Manhattan-bound stairs from behind the Woodlawn-bound stairs, also from the unpaid side of fare control.

In May 2018, New York City Transit Authority President Andy Byford announced his plan subway and bus modernization plan, known as Fast Forward, which included making an additional 50 stations compliant with the Americans with Disabilities Act of 1990 during the 2020–2024 MTA Capital Program to allow most riders to have an accessible station every two or three stops. The draft 2020–2024 Capital Program released in September 2019 included 66 stations that would receive ADA improvements. In December, the MTA announced that an additional twenty stations, including Burnside Avenue, would be made ADA-accessible as part of the Capital Program.

Station layout

This elevated station has three tracks and two island platforms, and is the only express station on the elevated portion of the Jerome Avenue Line. The only other express station on the Jerome Avenue Line is the underground 149th Street–Grand Concourse station. The 4 stops here at all times.

The 2008 artwork here is called How to Get to the Moon by Laura Battle, which speaks about the relationship between the sun and moon as well as day and night.

Exits
Four exits lead from the mezzanine to either southern corner of Burnside and Jerome Avenues, with two staircases to each corner. There are extra side exits from the wooden mezzanine near the stairs to the platform, and the station is three to four stories above street level.

References

External links 

 
 nycsubway.org — How to Get to the Moon Artwork by Laura Battle (2006)
 Station Reporter — 4 Train
 The Subway Nut — Burnside Avenue Pictures 
 MTA's Arts For Transit — Burnside Avenue (IRT Jerome Avenue Line)
 Burnside Avenue entrance from Google Maps Street View
Platforms from Google Maps Street View

IRT Jerome Avenue Line stations
New York City Subway stations in the Bronx
Railway stations in the United States opened in 1917
1917 establishments in New York City
University Heights, Bronx